Mohamed Abdel Shafy Said Abouzid (born 1 July 1985) is an Egyptian professional footballer who plays as a left back for Egyptian Premier League club Zamalek and the Egypt national team.

Club career
He started his career with Zamalek youth team then moved to ENPPI then moved to Ghazl El-Mehalla. He joined Zamalek's squad again in 2009.

International career
Abdel Shafy was called to join the Egypt national football team on 31 December 2009. In what was a surprise to some, the Egyptian team coach, Hassan Shehata, listed Abdel Shafy among the players heading to Angola for the 2010 Africa Cup of Nations. Abdel Shafy became a substitute for Sayed Moawad in this tournament, and managed to participate in 5 matches. He grabbed his first goal for Egypt in the 4–0 semi-final win against Algeria.

In May 2018 he was named in Egypt's preliminary squad for the 2018 World Cup in Russia.

Career statistics

International

International goals

Honours
Zamalek
Egyptian Premier League: 2014–15,2020–21, 2021-22

Egypt Cup: 2012–13, 2013–14, 2018–19, 2020–21
Egyptian Super Cup: 2019
CAF Super Cup: 2020

Al Ahli
Saudi Professional League: 2015–16
King Cup: 2016
Saudi Crown Prince Cup: 2014–15
Saudi Super Cup: 2016

International
Egypt
Africa Cup of Nations: 2010

References

External links

1985 births
Living people
Egyptian footballers
Egyptian expatriate footballers
Egypt international footballers
2010 Africa Cup of Nations players
2017 Africa Cup of Nations players
Al-Ahli Saudi FC players
Al-Fateh SC players
ENPPI SC players
Ghazl El Mahalla SC players
Zamalek SC players
Expatriate footballers in Saudi Arabia
Egyptian expatriate sportspeople in Saudi Arabia
Saudi Professional League players
Egyptian Premier League players
Footballers from Cairo
Association football fullbacks
2018 FIFA World Cup players